Portrait in Sound is an album by jazz trombonist Steve Davis.

Music and recording
The core band is Davis (trombone), David Hazeltine (piano), Nat Reeves (bass), and Joe Farnsworth (drums); other musicians appear as guests. Seven of the pieces are Davis originals. Other tracks included standards and a new Chick Corea composition, "Shadows".

Critical reception
The AllMusic reviewer wrote that "Portrait in Sound instantly reveals Steve Davis as an expert trombone player who communicates his musical visions with instinctive self-confidence as well as technical expertise."

Track listing
"Portrait in Sound"
"I'm Old Fashioned"
"Shadows"
"The Slowdown"
"Darn That Dream"
"Runway"
"Somber Song"
"A Bundle of Joy"
"I Found You"
"Samba D"

Personnel
 Steve Davis – trombone
 David Hazeltine – piano
 Nat Reeves – bass
 Joe Farnsworth – drums

Guest musicians
 Steve Wilson – alto sax, alto flute
 Brad Mehldau – piano
 Steve Nelson – vibraphone
 Avishai Cohen – bass
 Jeff Ballard – drums, percussion

References

Jazz albums by American artists